Return of the Read Menace is a compilation album, released in 1999 on G7 Welcoming Committee Records.

Track listing
 Screeching Weasel, "My Own World"
 J Church, "Tightrope"
 No Use For a Name, "Hybrid Moments" (Misfits Cover)
 Pitchshifter, "Microwaved (live remix)"
 Quixote, "Direction Sensor"
 ...But Alive, "Niemand Beisst Die Hand Die Einen Füttert"
 The 'Tone, "Pauline"
 Robb Johnson, "Permanent Free Zone"
 Ron Hawkins, "Small Victories"
 Propagandhi, "Hard Times" (Cro Mags cover)
 Randy, "Me and the Boys"
 Endeavor, "You Wanna Play Cards"
 Rhythm Activism, "Leo Lachance"
 Chumbawamba, "Misbehave"
 The Weakerthans, "Ringing of Revolution" (Phil Ochs cover)
 Wat Tyler, "History of the Soviet Union Part One (Karaoke Mix)"
 Hot Water Music, "Springtime"
 Avail, "Suspicious Minds"
 The Levellers, "Son of Baker"
 Atom and His Package, "Hats off to Halford"
 Discount, "Trouble in the Sky"
 Submission Hold, "Purchasing Power of the Paranoid and Hopeless"
 Moral Crux, "Degeneration"
 D.O.A., "Hell and Back"
 Cooper, "Girlfriend"

References

Record label compilation albums
G7 Welcoming Committee Records albums
1999 compilation albums